Brezovica Žumberačka is a settlement in Croatia, part of the Town of Ozalj in Karlovac County. It is located along the Slovene-Croatian border, next to Brezovica pri Metliki, with which it de facto forms one settlement. De jure, it is a Croatian exclave surrounded by Slovene villages of Brezovica pri Metliki and Malo Lešče.

The area of the settlement is 1.83 ha. As of 2011, the population is 19.

References

Populated places in Karlovac County